Mundum neriyatum (Malayalam: മുണ്ട് നേരിയത്; settu-mundu or mundu-set) is the traditional clothing of women in Kerala, a state in southwestern India. It is the oldest remnant of the ancient form of the sari which covered only the lower part of the body. The mundum neriyatum consists of two pieces of cloth, and could be worn in either the traditional style with the  tucked inside the blouse, or in the modern style with the  worn over the left shoulder.

Origins
The mundum neriyatum is the extant form of the ancient sari referred to as "Sattika" in Hindu, Buddhist and Jain literature. The mundu is the surviving form of lower garment of the ancient clothing referred to as antariya worn in a special way (lower garment). The neriyatu is the modern adaptation of a thin scarf worn from the right shoulder to the left shoulder referred to in ancient Buddhist-Jain texts as the uttariya. This two-set garments eventually evolved into what is now known as Kerala sari.

Surviving medieval Kerala mural paintings depict existence of three-styles of clothing worn by women, these include one-piece mundum, single-piece sari with over-lapping pleats resembling nivi-drape worn today by Mohiniyattam dancers and two-piece mundum neriyatum attire which evolved into Kerala sari.

Basic drape
 

The mundum neriyatum is traditionally white or cream in colour and consists of two pieces of cloth, which have a coloured strip at the border known as kara. The piece of cloth that drapes the lower garment is called the mundu. It is worn below the navel and around the hips, similar to the mundu worn by men in Kerala. The piece of cloth that is worn as the upper garment is called the neriyatu. One end of the neriyatu is tucked inside the pavada or petticoat and the remaining long end is worn across the front torso.  The neriyatu is worn over a blouse that reaches quite above the breast bone.  It is worn diagonally from along the right hips to the left shoulder and across the midriff, partly baring it. The remaining loose end of the neriyatu is left hanging from the left shoulder, resembling the 'nivi sari'.  Today the 'nivi drape', is the most common form of the sari. A mundum neriyatum is starched before being draped and is worn over a blouse that matches the colour of the border or kara.

Ornamental and festive use
The mundum neriyatum is worn as everyday costume and also as distinct costume on festive occasions, in which case the Kara is ornamental in couture. During the Keralite festival of onam, women of all ages wear the mundum neriyatum and take part in folk dance meant only for women called kaikottikalli. The mundum neriyatum for festive occasion has golden coloured borders or a broad zari border known as Kasavu, lending the costume another name of "Kasavu Sari". The colour for the blouse of the mundum neriyatum for this occasion is determined by the age and marital status of the woman. Young unmarried girls wear green coloured blouse, while married middle aged mothers wear red blouses.

The kasavu or the golden border is either pure golden layer, copper coated or artificial. The fabric of mundu-sari is cotton and is always woven by hand. Kara or simple line designs adorn the bottom of these saris, while at times small peacock or temple designs embellish the pallu. The mundum neriyatum is also known as Set mundu, Kasavu mundu, Mundu-sari, set-sari, or set veshti. The veshti is another version of the sari which consists of small upper clothing resembling a blouse-like garment worn without the pallu along with a mundu as lower garment.

Kerala sari
The Kerala sari is worn as a garment that consists of a single piece of cloth. Otherwise, the Kerala sari closely resembles the mundum neriyatum and is often worn by Malayali women as a quasi mundum neriyatum.

Cultural symbolism
The mundum neriyatum is the cultural costume of women of the Malayali community. The grace and appeal of the golden borders contrasting with the otherwise plain white mundum neriyatum of Keralite women has come to symbolize Malayali women. Both the traditional and modern styles of the mundum neriyatum are depicted in the paintings of the Indian painter Raja Ravi Varma. The mundum neriyatum was modified in several paintings depicting Shakuntala from the Mahabharata to a style of draping now popularly known as the 'nivi sari' or 'national drape'. In one of his paintings the Indian subcontinent was shown as a mother wearing a flowing nivi sari.

See also
 Mundu
 Kuthampally dhoties and set mundu
 Sari

Notes

External links

References and bibliography

Boulanger, C (1997) Saris: An Illustrated Guide to the Indian Art of Draping, Shakti Press International, New York. 
Mohapatra, R. P. (1992) "Fashion styles of ancient India", B. R. Publishing corporation, 
Ghurye (1951) "Indian costume", Popular book depot (Bombay); (Includes rare photographs of 19th century Namboothiri and nair women in ancient sari with bare upper torso).
Alkazi, Roshan (1983) "Ancient Indian costume", Art Heritage
Mahaparinibbanasutta (ancient Buddhist text)
Miller, Daniel & Banerjee, Mukulika; (2004) "The Sari", Lustre press / Roli books
 Bjorn Landstrom (1964) "The Quest for India", Doubleday (publisher) English Edition, Stockholm.
 T.K Velu Pillai, (1940) "The Travancore State Manual"; 4 volumes; Trivandrum
 Miller, J. Innes. (1969). The Spice Trade of The Roman Empire: 29 B.C. to A.D. 641. Oxford University Press. Special edition for Sandpiper Books. 1998. .
 K.V. Krishna Iyer (1971) Kerala's Relations with the Outside World, pp. 70, 71 in "The Cochin Synagogue Quatercentenary Celebrations Commemoration Volume", Kerala History Association, Cochin.
 Periplus Maris Erythraei "The Periplus of the Erythraean Sea", (trans). Wilfred Schoff (1912), reprinted South Asia Books 1995 

Dresses
History of Asian clothing
Saris
Kerala clothing